Abdelkader Alloula ‎ (1939 in Ghazaouet, Algeria – March 14, 1994, in Oran, Algeria) was an Algerian playwright. He was assassinated by GIA terrorists.

Biography
Alloula was born in Ghazaouet in western Algeria.  He joined the Algerian National Theatre upon its creation in 1963 following independence.  His works, typically in vernacular Algerian Arabic, included:

 El-Aâleg (1969) - "The Leech", a satire of corrupt administration
 El-Khobza (1970) - "Bread"
 Homq Salim (1972) - "Salim's Madness", a monologue based on Nikolai Gogol's "Diary of a Madman"
 Hammam Rabbi (1975) - "The Lord's Bath", based on Gogol's The Government Inspector
 The Generous Trilogy:
 El-Agoual (1980) - "The Sayings"
 El-Adjouad (1984) - "The Generous"
 El-Litham (1989) - "The Veil"

He was working on an Arabic version of Tartuffe when he was shot by two members of FIDA (Islamic Front for Armed Jihad) during Ramadan on March 10, 1994, as he left his house in Oran. He was transferred to a hospital in Paris, where he died four days later. His widow, Radja Alloula, and friends set up the Abdelkader Alloula Foundation in his memory.

His brother, Malek Alloula, is also a noted Algerian writer.

Further reading

References

1939 births
1994 deaths
Algerian writers
Algerian filmmakers
Assassinated Algerian people
People murdered in Algeria
Algerian dramatists and playwrights
People from Ghazaouet
20th-century dramatists and playwrights